Agrigento Cathedral (Cattedrale Metropolitana di San Gerlando) is a Roman Catholic cathedral in Agrigento, Sicily, dedicated to Saint Gerland. 
 Founded in the 11th century, it was consecrated in 1099 as the seat of the restored bishop of Agrigento. The diocese was elevated to an archdiocese in 2000, and the cathedral is thus now the seat of the Archbishop of Agrigento.

References

External links
 La Valle dei Templi website

Sources
Di Giovanni, Giuseppe: Agrigento, visita al centro storico (nd)

Cathedral
Roman Catholic cathedrals in Italy
Cathedrals in Sicily
Churches in the province of Agrigento
1099 establishments in Europe
11th-century establishments in Italy
Romanesque architecture in Sicily
11th-century Roman Catholic church buildings in Italy
Minor basilicas in Sicily